The Steamboat House, also known as the Emmer-Hughes House, is a historic house in New Iberia, Louisiana, U.S.. It was built in 1896, and it belonged to a New Iberia Mayor as well as Lieutenant Governor Paul N. Cyr. It is listed on the National Register of Historic Places.

History
The house was built in 1896 for John Emmer, a farmer, real estate investor, and the owner of a brickyard. He also served as the mayor of New Iberia from 1889 to 1891.  The house was inherited by his daughter and his son-in-law, George Lebau, the president of the New Iberia National Bank, in 1903. The Lebaus lived here until 1937. 

The house was acquired by Paul N. Cyr, a politician who served as the Lieutenant Governor of Louisiana from 1928 to 1931, in 1937.

Architectural significance
The house was designed in the Victorian architectural style. It has been listed on the National Register of Historic Places since July 27, 1979.

References

National Register of Historic Places in Iberia Parish, Louisiana
Victorian architecture in Louisiana
Houses completed in 1896